Lois D. Juliber (born 1949) is an American businesswoman.

Early life and education
Lois Juliber was born in Brooklyn, New York City in 1949. She grew up on Long Island. She graduated from Wellesley College in 1971 and received an MBA from Harvard Business School in 1973.

Career
She worked for General Foods for fifteen years, ending her career as vice president. She joined Colgate-Palmolive in 1988 as a VP, and was appointed chief technology officer in 1992. She was promoted to executive vice president for Developed Markets in 1997, then chief operating officer in 2000, and finally vice chairman in 2004.

She sits on the boards of directors of Goldman Sachs and Kraft Foods. She has sat on the board of DuPont.

Philanthropy
She serves as Chairman of the Mastercard Foundation. She is also a member of the boards of trustees of Wellesley College, Girls, Inc. and Women's World Banking. She is also a member of the President's Council at Olin College. She received the Financial Women's Association Woman of the Year Award in 1995, the Starlight Association Award for Corporate Leadership, and the American Advertising Foundation Award for Diversity Leadership.

References

1949 births
Living people
People from Brooklyn
Wellesley College alumni
American chief operating officers
American women in business
Directors of DuPont
Kraft Foods people
Goldman Sachs people
Harvard Business School alumni
American chief technology officers
People from Long Island
21st-century American women